Nikola Lončar (Serbian Cyrillic: Никола Лончар; born May 31, 1972) is a Serbian former professional basketball player. He also holds Spanish citizenship.

Professional career
Lončar started his career at Partizan, making his professional debut in 1989. With Partizan, he won the Euroleague in 1992. Lončar also played for Real Madrid, Cagiva Varese, PSG Racing, Maccabi Tel Aviv, Joventut Badalona, Zucchetti Montecatini, Breogán, Estudiantes and Armani Jeans Milano.

National team career
Lončar was a member of the Yugoslav national team at four major tournaments during the 1990s. He took silver medal at the 1996 Summer Olympics in Atlanta, United States, gold medal at the 1998 FIBA World Championship in Greece, and two FIBA European Championship medals (gold in 1997 and bronze in 1999).

Post-playing career
After ending his basketball playing career in 2006, Lončar began working on Spanish television as a studio analyst for the NBA coverage on Movistar+ platform.

In October 2015, Lončar became the president of Kragujevački Radnički.

In March 2018, Lončar was named a sports director of Partizan NIS. In February 2021, Partizan parted ways with Lončar. Afterwards, he joined staff of Kragujevac-based club Radnički 1950.

References

External links
 Nikola Lončar at acb.com
 Nikola Lončar at legabasket.it
 Nikola Lončar at euroleague.net
 Nikola Lončar at fiba.com

1972 births
Living people
ABA League players
Basketball players at the 1996 Summer Olympics
CB Breogán players
CB Estudiantes players
FIBA EuroBasket-winning players
Joventut Badalona players
KK Partizan players
Liga ACB players
Maccabi Tel Aviv B.C. players
Medalists at the 1996 Summer Olympics
Olimpia Milano players
Olympic basketball players of Yugoslavia
Olympic medalists in basketball
Olympic silver medalists for Serbia and Montenegro
Pallacanestro Varese players
Paris Racing Basket players
Real Madrid Baloncesto players
Serbian expatriate basketball people in France
Serbian expatriate basketball people in Israel
Serbian expatriate basketball people in Italy
Serbian expatriate basketball people in Spain
Serbian men's basketball players
Serbian basketball executives and administrators
Shooting guards
Sportspeople from Kragujevac
FIBA World Championship-winning players
1998 FIBA World Championship players